The William Irving House is a historic house in Mankato, Minnesota, United States.  It was built in 1873 in Second Empire style for retired merchant William Irving (b. 1821).  The house was listed on the National Register of Historic Places in 1980 for its local significance in the themes of architecture and commerce.  It was nominated for being a well-preserved example of a locally uncommon architectural style.

See also
 National Register of Historic Places listings in Blue Earth County, Minnesota

References

1873 establishments in Minnesota
Houses completed in 1873
Houses in Blue Earth County, Minnesota
Houses on the National Register of Historic Places in Minnesota
Mankato, Minnesota
National Register of Historic Places in Blue Earth County, Minnesota
Second Empire architecture in Minnesota